Comai may refer to:

Comai County, county in Tibet
Comai (village), village in Tibet

Tibet